Mali Požarevac  is a village located in the municipality of Belgrade, Serbia. According to the 2011 census, the village has a population of 1,391 inhabitants.

References

Suburbs of Belgrade
Sopot, Belgrade